General Grey may refer to:

Charles Grey (British Army officer) (1804–1870), British Army general
Charles Grey, 1st Earl Grey (1729–1807), British Army lieutenant general
Henry George Grey (1766–1845), British Army lieutenant general
John Grey (Australian general) (born 1939), Australian Army lieutenant general
John Grey (British Army officer, died 1760), British Army major general
John Grey (British Army officer, died 1856) (c. 1782–1856), British Army lieutenant general
Ron Grey (born 1930), Australian Army major general

See also
General Gray (disambiguation)